The English school year  runs from early September to mid or late July of the following year. Most schools operate a three term school year, each term divided into half terms.

Autumn term runs from early September to mid December (half term falls in late October). Spring Term runs from early January to Easter. (half term falls in mid February). Summer Term runs from Easter to mid July (half term falls in late May or early June).

At the end of each half term, in October, February and May, there is a holiday which lasts about one week (usually nine full days, including two weekends). 

The Christmas holidays separate the autumn and spring terms, and the Easter holidays separate the spring and summer terms.  Each holiday lasts about two weeks. 

The summer holiday begins in late July and is usually about six weeks long, sometimes ending only two weeks away from the Autumnal equinox. The local education authority sets the holiday dates for all schools under its control. Academies set their own dates, but often match the dates of other local schools. There may be days when individual schools are closed due to teacher training, bad weather, or other unplanned events. Parents are advised to contact the school directly with regards to closure, but general information can be found on local radio websites and often the local education authority website.

English schools, conventionally, have 3 terms - Autumn term, Spring term and Summer term - each term is split into two.
School (and term 1) begins in early September and finishes late October for a week half term. It resumes in early November and term 1 finishes around mid December. 
Between term 1 and 2 is the Christmas break from mid December to early January. Around a 2-3 week break.
Term 2 begins early January and finishes mid February with a week half term. It resumes in late February and term two ends in late March or early April, depending on when Easter falls. Usually a 2-3 week break. N.B In 2008, Easter Sunday fell on the Sunday 23 March, so most regions in England did not have its Easter Weekend inside its break. The term continued for another two weeks until the first Friday in April in 2008, in order to equal the school days in Term 2 and Term 3. The schools in England still closed on Friday 21 March and Monday 24 March 2008 as these were bank holidays.
Term 3 begins in mid to late April and finishes in late May with a week half term. It resumes in early June and usually finishes during mid to late July. 
Between term 3 and the next academic year is the Summer break from late July to early September. A 6-9 week break, varying between regions and school types.

English Independent Schools 
Independent schools (also known as "public schools" (age about 13+) and "private schools" or "preparatory schools" (under 13) in the UK) generally operate an academic year (Independent academic year) similar to the above, but often have shorter terms and longer holidays. More traditional schools use the term names originating at Oxford University; namely Michaelmas term (autumn), named after the Feast of Saint Michael and All Angels on 29 September, Lent term or Easter term (spring) and Trinity term (summer), named after Trinity Sunday which is eight weeks after Easter.

Some international schools operate a different system using semesters rather than terms.

Impact of school holidays on tourism and the economy 
The timing of the English school holidays has a major impact on traffic. During holidays there is a marked reduction in traffic congestion at peak periods on many routes, leading to faster journey times.  (Since England does not have a wide network of state-run school transport, many parents prefer to take their children to and from school by car.)

Another important consequence of the timing of English school holidays is the pricing of holiday accommodation. There is generally a steep rise in the cost of accommodation during the school holidays, due to increased demand. The English tourism industry closely monitors various websites that provide up-to-date school holiday information, and sets its prices accordingly. Prices often drop by hundreds of pounds just one week into the new school term. Since most schools have a strict policy against children being taken out of school, parents who decide to save money by taking a family holiday during the school term risk not only damaging their children's education but also fines or warnings from their school. Parents can be issued with a penalty notice whenever they take their children on holiday during term time without getting authorisation from the school. Penalty notices can be issued by local councils, headteachers (including deputy and assistant heads authorised by them) and the police.  Generally, schools will agree to no more than 10 school days of absence in any school year.

School holidays in fiction
The Swallows and Amazons series of children’s novels by Arthur Ransome are all set in the school holidays, generally the long (August) summer holidays although some are set in Easter or winter. For example, in "Pigeon Post", he wrote:  Term time was gone as if it had been wiped out. Real life was beginning again.

See also
 School holiday

References

Holidays in England
Holidays